The World Violation Tour was a 1990 concert tour by English electronic group Depeche Mode in support of the act's seventh studio album, Violator, which was released in March 1990. It was estimated that by the end of the tour, Depeche Mode had toured to 1.2 million fans.

Tour details
The band rehearsed for the tour in Pensacola, Florida, the same city where the tour kicked off. It was the first time the band has performed live in the state, and the band received some flak from locals who didn't understand their appearance: "I've been called a faggot about twenty times today, mostly from guys leaning out of trucks. This is sort of a backward place, isn't it?" noted Alan Wilder.

The tour kicked off with a North American leg in late May, finishing up in early August in Los Angeles at Dodger Stadium. The North American dates were met with high demand with sellouts in Dallas, Chicago, Orlando, Tampa and Miami; 42,000 tickets for the concert at Giants Stadium in East Rutherford, New Jersey had reportedly been sold within four hours of going on sale, while the Dodger Stadium shows had sold out on the first day of sale. Later in the month, the group played a sole date in Australia, in Sydney, prior to a six-date tour of Japan in September. Following the Japanese dates, the band commenced a European tour, beginning in Brussels in late September. The leg included three dates at the Palais Omnisports Bercy in Paris, where the group performed to approximately 50,000 people. The leg lasted two months and concluded with the final show of the tour in Birmingham, UK, in late November.

The projections were made by Anton Corbijn, whose work was projected on large video screens. The tour required approximately 100 stage crew and 11 articulated lorries to transport the stage set.

Industrial band Nitzer Ebb opened for the band in North America. Rolling Stone magazine called out the tour as one of the highlights of the 1990 summer music scene, saying "These British synth poppers offer post-industrial melancholy you can dance to. And their misery certainly loves company – on their last tour, they sold out the Rose Bowl."

Recordings
Depeche Mode never released any official content from the World Violation Tour for commercial purposes, the reason for which Alan Wilder stated was that there was too little time lapsed from Music for the Masses Tour to release a new live EP from the tour, as the previous one was filmed and was released as 101.

Two concerts of the American leg of the tour, one in San Francisco and one in LA, were recorded by the staff of the stadium. The second one was even released on a small series promotional CD in Latvia, with as many as 250 printed copies. The band issued 90-second snippets of each song from the LA show on their website in 2012.

Musicians
Dave Gahan – lead vocals
Martin Gore – guitar, samplers, percussion pads, lead and backing vocals
Alan Wilder – samplers, percussion pads, drums, backing vocals
Andrew Fletcher – samplers, percussion pads, backing vocals

Setlist
"Kaleid-Crucified" (Intro)
"World in My Eyes"
"Halo"
"Shake the Disease"
"Everything Counts" (Tim Simenon/Mark Saunders Remix) 
"Master and Servant"
"Never Let Me Down Again" (Split and Aggro Mixes)
"Waiting for the Night"
Song performed by Martin Gore
 "I Want You Now" (Acoustic)
 "Here Is the House" (Acoustic)
 "Little 15" (Acoustic)
Song performed by Martin Gore
 "World Full of Nothing" (Acoustic)
 "Blue Dress" (Acoustic, only performed at San Diego and Paris)
 "Sweetest Perfection" (Acoustic)
"Clean"
"Stripped"
"Policy of Truth"
"Enjoy the Silence" (with bits from the 'Bass Line' remix)
"Strangelove"
"Personal Jesus"
 encore 1
"Black Celebration"
"A Question of Time"
 encore 2
"Behind the Wheel"
Song performed by Dave Gahan
 "Route 66" (Bobby Troup cover)

Note: Setlist additions featuring multiple songs are options which were rotated between dates.

Tour dates

References

 Miller, Jonathan. Stripped: The True Story of Depeche Mode. Omnibus Press, 2004.

External links
Official site

1990 concert tours
Depeche Mode concert tours